The  Chantuu people are Mongol sub-group in Hovd province, Mongolia. Their name from the Chantou called Turkic peoples in Central Asia.

See also
Demographics of Mongolia
Zunghar Khanate

Mongol peoples
Mongols
Ethnic groups in Mongolia
Oirats
Dzungar Khanate